Andrius Šidlauskas (born 30 October 1984) is a former Lithuanian professional footballer.

External links
Profile

1984 births
Living people
Lithuanian footballers
Association football midfielders
Lithuanian expatriate footballers
Expatriate footballers in Belarus
FC Šiauliai players
FK Ekranas players
FC Granit Mikashevichi players